Thakita Thakita is a 2010 Telugu coming-of-age film directed by Sreehari Nanu and produced by Bharat Thakur. The film features an ensemble cast of characters including Harshvardhan Rane, Haripriya, Aditi Chengappa, Ananth Krishnamurthy, and Karthik Sabesh. The film has music by Bobo Shashi, editing by Marthand K. Venkatesh, and cinematography by K. K. Senthil Kumar. The film was released on 3 September 2010.

The film marks the production debut of Telugu actress Bhumika Chawla. The film was dubbed in Tamil as Thulli Ezhunthathu Kadhal.

Plot
Sridhar, Chandana, Nandini, Kishore, Scud, Mahesh, Jessica, and Bhakti are all friends from school. They all finish their final year exams and try their level best to kick-start their careers while they face some interesting situations in life. Nandini and her senior Kishore are in love, but Nandini's father Alagappan hardly understands his daughter's yearning for some lost prestige. Mahesh and Scud have not been on talking terms since years. Bhakti is a happy-go-lucky girl, or so it seems. Jessica, a foreign student, is trying to make it big in fashion in India, living as a guest with the rich Chandana. Sri is in love with Chandana but does not want to express it to her before he settles down in life. And then there is Dakshayini, who is bent on stealing Sridhar from Chandana. The film covers the coming of age of all these friends, as they try to solve a Rubik's cube called life. It also covers a lot of issues like acid attacks on girls, suicides, misunderstandings, false prestige and so on.

Cast

Soundtrack

The music was composed by Bobo Shashi. Music released on MADHURA Music Company.

References

 Cinegoer review
 Rediff review
 Supergood Movies review
 Bharat Student review

External links
 

2010 films
2010s Telugu-language films
Indian romance films
2010 romance films